"An Angel"  is a song by European-American pop group The Kelly Family. It was produced by Kathy Kelly and Hartmut Pfannmüller for their eighth regular studio album Over the Hump (1994) and features lead vocals by Angelo and Paddy Kelly. Paddy wrote the song for his mother, Barbara Kelly, who died in 1982 from breast cancer. He wrote it on the family's boat, Santa Barbara.

In 2006, the song was also covered by English singer Declan Galbraith and served as the first single and opening track from his second album Thank You (2006). In 2017, The Kelly Family re-recorded the song for their We Got Love (2017). Other remakes were also recorded by Silbermond lead singer Stefanie Kloß for the compilation album Sing meinen Song – Das Tauschkonzert Vol 4 (2017) and by Gregor Meyle for his album Meylensteine Vol 1 (2015).

Track listings

Credits and personnel 
Credits adapted from the liner notes of Over the Hump.

Songwriting – The Kelly Family
Production – Hartmut Pfannmüller, Kathy Kelly
Executive production – Dan Kelly, Mike Ungefehr
Engineering – Günther Kasper

Charts

Weekly charts

Year-end charts

Certifications

References

External links
 KellyFamily.de — official site

1994 singles
1994 songs
Number-one singles in Austria
Universal Music Group singles
The Kelly Family songs
Songs about dreams